Gem City Roller Derby (GCRD) is a women's flat track roller derby league based in Dayton, Ohio. Founded in 2006, the league features two teams that compete against teams from other leagues, plus three home league teams that play each other. Gem City is a member of the Women's Flat Track Derby Association (WFTDA).

History and organization
GCRD was founded as Gem City Rollergirls in January 2006 by Ginger Clark and Andrea Moore, known as "Helen of DesTroy" and "Cyn Vicious". The league initially formed two teams, the Queens of Hearts and the Aces of Spades, that later became the Rude Girls and Damage Inc. After a decrease in league membership, the two teams became one for several years. Steady growth led to a return of the two-team structure for the 2014 season. The new team names are The Purple Reign and The Violet Femmes.

Gem City rebranded in June 2016 as Gem City Roller Derby, and further expanded to include three intraleague home teams, who play one another during the travel team off season: Bully Frogs, Snark Attack, and Murder Squad. The Bully Frogs were the initial home season champion, with a 174–154 victory over the Murder Squad in March 2017.

WFTDA
GCRD initially joined the Women's Flat Track Derby Association (WFTDA) in December 2007.  However, after struggling to maintain a sufficient number of eligible skaters, GCRD was unable to play any fully sanctioned bouts during the 2008 season. During 2009 several long-standing skaters left the league, which also incurred increases in rink costs; however the league survived. In 2010, the league reverted to the status of apprentice members of the WFTDA. The league grew each year following and, during the 2013 boot camp, nearly doubled in size to a total of over fifty skaters. Gem City earned its full WFTDA status back for the 2014 season.

Rankings

 league did not receive WFTDA final rankings 2010-2013

References

Roller derby leagues established in 2006
Roller derby leagues in Ohio
Sports teams in Dayton, Ohio
2006 establishments in Ohio